Paddy Healy (21 July 1922 – 26 April 1983) was an Irish hurler and Gaelic footballer. His league and championship career with the Cork senior teams as a dual player lasted ten years from 1943 until 1953.

Born in Ballincollig, Healy began his thirty-year club hurling and football career with the Ballincollig club. He won a junior football championship medal in 1940 before losing three successive senior hurling championship finals. Healy subsequently joined the Clonakilty club, winning senior football championship medals in 1944, 1946, 1947 and 1952. He ended his career with the Ballincollig club, winning a divisional football championship medal in 1964.

Healy made his debut on the inter-county scene at the age of twenty-one when he was selected for the Cork senior hurling team during the 1943 championship. Over the course of the following decade he enjoyed much success, winning All-Ireland medals in 1943, 1944 and 1946. As a member of the Cork senior football team, Healy won an All-Ireland medal in 1945.

Healy was the grandfather of association footballer Colin Healy.

Honours

Ballincollig
Cork Junior Football Championship (1): 1940
Mid Cork Junior A Football Championship (1): 1964

Clonakilty
Cork Senior Football Championship (4): 1944, 1946, 1947, 1952

Cork
All-Ireland Senior Hurling Championship (3): 1943, 1944, 1946
All-Ireland Senior Football Championship (1): 1945
Munster Senior Hurling Championship (5): 1943, 1944, 1946, 1952, 1953
Munster Senior Football Championship (1): 1945
All-Ireland Junior Hurling Championship (1): 1950
Munster Junior Hurling Championship (1): 1950

References

1922 births
1983 deaths
Ballincollig Gaelic footballers
Clonakilty Gaelic footballers
Ballincollig hurlers
Clonakilty hurlers
Cork Gaelic footballers
Cork inter-county hurlers
Dual players
Irish Army officers